Eupalitin is an O-methylated flavonol. It can be found in Ipomopsis aggregata.

Glycosides 
Eupalitin 3-O-β-D-galactopyranoside can be isolated from Tephrosia spinosa.

Eupalin is the eupalitin 30-rhamnoside.

References 

O-methylated flavonols